Maryino is a district of South-Eastern Administrative Okrug of the federal city of Moscow, Russia. Population: 252,597 (2017 est.);   It is the most populated district of Moscow.

History

In the early 12th–13th centuries, the area of the modern district was where the village of Maryino stood near Chaginskoye Marshes.  The district's name dates back to that village, which itself was called after Mariya Yaroslavna, mother of Tsar Ivan III, who founded the village.

In 1898, Lyublino Aeration Fields were built in this area.  The fields occupied the territory of over one thousand hectares. In 1911, Moscow canalization system won a Golden Prize in Brussels.  After the Kuryanovo Aeration System had been built in 1978, it was decided to use the territory of the former Lyublino Fields for construction of new apartment buildings.  As Moscow grew in later years, the territory was incorporated as Maryino District of Moscow.

In 1996, two metro stations were opened in the district.

References

External links
Official website of Maryino District 
Official website of the local self-government of Maryino District 
Nashe Maryino (Our Maryino), unofficial website 
Maryino District news 
Birds of Maryino District 

Districts of Moscow
South-Eastern Administrative Okrug